Notre Dame High School was a Catholic, all–male, non–residential college preparatory school in the Detroit suburb of Harper Woods, Michigan. It was closed in 2005, with 295 students, after more than 50 years due to budget concerns, according to the Archdiocese of Detroit. The school had about 300 students at the time of closure, down from almost 1000 during its peak enrollment levels. It was founded in 1954 and operated by the Marist Fathers and Brothers, and the first class graduated in 1958.

Throughout its existence, the school was located next door to Regina High School, a Catholic, all–female school; and Lutheran High School East. Lutheran High School East closed in 2004 and Regina High School moved to Warren, Michigan in 2007.

Closing

The Archdiocese of Detroit announced in early March 2005 that 18 Detroit–area schools—including Notre Dame High School—would be shut down because declining enrollment and an escalating budget deficit. Archdiocese spokesman Richard Laskos called the decision "irrevocable" despite protests from family, students and alumni of the school.

The Friends of Notre Dame Incorporated filed a lawsuit to keep the school open, but a Wayne County Circuit Court judge ruled against them. Entertainer Bill Cosby, who had spoken in support of keeping the school open, was scheduled to attend a meeting with activists protesting the school's closure, but canceled his appearance.

It was used as a filming location for the 2012 film Red Dawn. Mark Binelli, author of Detroit City is the Place to Be, wrote that the school cafeteria was used as the catering hall for the employees of the film production.

School culture
Tom Morwatts, a guitarist for the band Mutants, said that Notre Dame was "legendary for its dances." He explained that the school needed to raise funds to pay for its athletic facilities, so the school hosted dances for teenagers, inviting bands such as The Supremes that attracted patrons from Metro Detroit. Future State senator Curtis_Hertel_Jr. ND '96 continued that tradition with booking local punk bands who believed in spreading progressive ideas of peace, unity, and acceptance.

Notable alumni
 David Bonior, former United States Congressman
 Dave Coulier, comedian, entertainer, and actor from Full House.  
 Doug Weight, a former Olympic hockey player and centre for the St. Louis Blues of the NHL
 John Blum, former NHL defenseman, 1981-1995
 Dave Debol, former NHL hockey player
 Mark Cendrowski, TV director
 Johnny Wujeck, Actor and stylist, judge on Americas Next Top Model
 Matt Servitto, Actor from The Sopranos and Your Pretty Face Is Going to Hell
 Ben Blackwell, writer, drummer, co-founder of Third Man Records
 Greg Stempin, former professional European basketball player

References
 Binelli, Mark. Detroit City is the Place to Be. Metropolitan Books, Henry Holt and Company (New York). First Edition, 2012.  (hardback version).
 Miller, Steve. Detroit Rock City: The Uncensored History of Rock 'n' Roll in America's Loudest City. Da Capo Press, 2013. , 9780306821844.

External links

Notre Dame Alumni Association 
Notre Dame Alumni Association

Notes

Educational institutions disestablished in 2005
Boys' schools in Michigan
Educational institutions established in 1954
Defunct Catholic secondary schools in Michigan
2005 disestablishments in Michigan
1954 establishments in Michigan
Schools in Wayne County, Michigan